Thompsonville is a census-designated place (CDP) in Washington County, Pennsylvania, United States. The population was 3,520 at the 2010 census.

Geography
Thompsonville is located at  (40.281373, -80.119665).

Demographics
At the 2000 census there were 3,592 people, 1,228 households, and 1,024 families living in the CDP. The population density was 1,753.8 people per square mile (676.5/km2). There were 1,254 housing units at an average density of 612.3/sq mi (236.2/km2).  The racial makeup of the CDP was 98.13% White, 0.33% African American, 0.06% Native American, 0.81% Asian, 0.28% from other races, and 0.39% from two or more races. Hispanic or Latino of any race were 0.70%.

Of the 1,228 households 34.7% had children under the age of 18 living with them, 76.8% were married couples living together, 4.3% had a female householder with no husband present, and 16.6% were non-families. 14.7% of households were one person and 7.6% were one person aged 65 or older. The average household size was 2.73 and the average family size was 3.03.

The age distribution was 24.3% under the age of 18, 4.0% from 18 to 24, 20.7% from 25 to 44, 29.0% from 45 to 64, and 22.0% 65 or older. The median age was 46 years. For every 100 females, there were 88.5 males. For every 100 females age 18 and over, there were 84.6 males.

The median household income was $75,000 and the median family income  was $89,587. Males had a median income of $70,240 versus $38,839 for females. The per capita income for the CDP was $36,853. About 2.5% of families and 3.9% of the population were below the poverty line, including 2.2% of those under age 18 and 3.9% of those age 65 or over.

References

Census-designated places in Washington County, Pennsylvania
Pittsburgh metropolitan area
Census-designated places in Pennsylvania